"Taffy was a Welshman" is an English language nursery rhyme created as a derogatory and offensive slander of the welsh people. It was popular between the eighteenth and twentieth centuries. It has a Roud Folk Song Index number of 19237.

Lyrics
Versions of this rhyme vary. Some common versions are:

Origins and history
The term "Taffy" (pronounced with a short "a" to rhyme with Daffy Duck) may be a merging of the common Welsh name "Dafydd" and the Welsh river "Taff" on which Cardiff is built, and seems to have been in use by the mid-eighteenth century. The term "Taffy" or "Taff" was not necessarily derogatory, though clearly it is in the verse and in many other contexts. In WW2 it was used without any slur, to refer to soldiers of Welsh origin, just as other regional slang names like Geordie, Scouse or Jock were used. Similarly a Welsh teacher in an English school might be referred to as "Taffy (surname)". However, the suggestion of a slur remains in the fact that Welsh people would very rarely refer to themselves as "A Taff", whereas, for example, Geordies might use that name for themselves. The rhyme may be related to one published in Tommy Thumb's Pretty Song Book, printed in London around 1744, which had the lyrics:

The earliest record we have of the better known rhyme is from Nancy Cock's Pretty Song Book, printed in London about 1780, which had one verse:

Similar versions were printed in collections in the late eighteenth century, however, in Songs for the Nursery printed in 1805, the first signs of violence were evident, ending with:

In the 1840s James Orchard Halliwell collected a two verse version that followed this with:

This version seems to have been particularly popular in the English counties that bordered Wales, where it was sung on Saint David's Day (1 March) complete with leek-wearing effigies of Welshmen. The image of thieving Welshmen seems to have begun to die down by the mid-twentieth century, although the insulting rhyme was still sometimes used along with the name "Taffy" for any Welshman.

Notes

English folk songs
English children's songs
Traditional children's songs
Songs about fictional male characters
Songs about crime
Cultural depictions of Welsh men
Regional nicknames
1780 songs
English nursery rhymes
Year of song unknown
Songwriter unknown